Santa Cruz Airfield  is an aerodrome located in Santa Cruz, some  west-northwest of Torres Vedras, Portugal. It accommodates light aircraft.

See also
Transport in Portugal
List of airports in Portugal

References

 Aeroclub website (in local language)

Airports in Portugal
Buildings and structures in Lisbon District
Torres Vedras